In mathematics, one can often define a direct product of objects already known, giving a new one. This generalizes the Cartesian product of the underlying sets, together with a suitably defined structure on the product set. More abstractly, one talks about the product in category theory, which formalizes these notions.

Examples are the product of sets, groups (described below), rings, and other algebraic structures. The product of topological spaces is another instance.

There is also the direct sum – in some areas this is used interchangeably, while in others it is a different concept.

Examples

The difference between this and the preceding example is that  is now a group, and so we have to also say how to add their elements. This is done by defining 
 Although the ring  is a field,  is not one, because the element  does not have a multiplicative inverse.

In a similar manner, we can talk about the direct product of finitely many algebraic structures, for example,  This relies on the fact that the direct product is associative up to isomorphism.

Group direct product

In group theory one can define the direct product of two groups  and  denoted by  For abelian groups which are written additively, it may also be called the direct sum of two groups, denoted by 

It is defined as follows:
 the set of the elements of the new group is the Cartesian product of the sets of elements of  that is 
 on these elements put an operation, defined element-wise: 
Note that  may be the same as 

This construction gives a new group.

The reverse also holds. There is the following recognition theorem: If a group  contains two normal subgroups  such that  and the intersection of  contains only the identity, then  is isomorphic to  A relaxation of these conditions, requiring only one subgroup to be normal, gives the semidirect product.

As an example, take as  two copies of the unique (up to isomorphisms) group of order 2,  say  Then  with the operation element by element. For instance,  and 

With a direct product, we get some natural group homomorphisms for free: the projection maps defined by

are called the coordinate functions.

Also, every homomorphism  to the direct product is totally determined by its component functions 

For any group  and any integer  repeated application of the direct product gives the group of all -tuples   (for  this is the trivial group), for example  and

Direct product of modules
The direct product for modules (not to be confused with the tensor product) is very similar to the one defined for groups above, using the Cartesian product with the operation of addition being componentwise, and the scalar multiplication just distributing over all the components. Starting from  we get Euclidean space  the prototypical example of a real -dimensional vector space.

Note that a direct product for a finite index  is canonically isomorphic to the direct sum  The direct sum and direct product are not isomorphic for infinite indices, where the elements of a direct sum are zero for all but for a finite number of entries. They are dual in the sense of category theory: the direct sum is the coproduct, while the direct product is the product.

For example, consider  and  the infinite direct product and direct sum of the real numbers. Only sequences with a finite number of non-zero elements are in  For example,  is in  but  is not.

Topological space direct product

Defining the topology is a little tricky. For finitely many factors, this is the obvious and natural thing to do: simply take as a basis of open sets to be the collection of all Cartesian products of open subsets from each factor:

This topology is called the product topology.

The product topology for infinite products has a twist, and this has to do with being able to make all the projection maps continuous and to make all functions into the product  continuous if and only if all its component functions are continuous (that is, to satisfy the categorical definition of product: the morphisms here are continuous functions): we take as a basis of open sets to be the collection of all Cartesian products of open subsets from each factor, as before, with the proviso that all but finitely many of the open subsets are the entire factor:

The more natural-sounding topology would be, in this case, to take products of infinitely many open subsets as before, and this does yield a somewhat interesting topology, the box topology. However it is not too difficult to find an example of bunch of continuous component functions whose product function is not continuous (see the separate entry box topology for an example and more). The problem which makes the twist necessary is ultimately rooted in the fact that the intersection of open sets is only guaranteed to be open for finitely many sets in the definition of topology.

Products (with the product topology) are nice with respect to preserving properties of their factors; for example, the product of Hausdorff spaces is Hausdorff; the product of connected spaces is connected, and the product of compact spaces is compact. That last one, called Tychonoff's theorem, is yet another equivalence to the axiom of choice.

For more properties and equivalent formulations, see the separate entry product topology.

Direct product of binary relations
On the Cartesian product of two sets with binary relations  define  as  If  are both reflexive, irreflexive, transitive, symmetric, or antisymmetric, then  will be also.

Direct product in universal algebra
For each  the th projection  is defined by  It is a surjective homomorphism between the  algebras 

As a special case, if the index set  the direct product of two  algebras  is obtained, written as  If  just contains one binary operation  the above definition of the direct product of groups is obtained, using the notation   Similarly, the definition of the direct product of modules is subsumed here.

Categorical product

The direct product can be abstracted to an arbitrary category. In a category, given a collection of objects  indexed by a set , a product of these objects is an object  together with morphisms  for all , such that if  is any other object with morphisms  for all , there exists a unique morphism  whose composition with  equals  for every .  

Such  and  do not always exist.

Internal and external direct product

Some authors draw a distinction between an internal direct product and an external direct product. If  and  then we say that  is an internal direct product of  while if  are not subobjects then we say that this is an external direct product.

See also

Notes

References

 

Abstract algebra

ru:Прямое произведение#Прямое произведение групп